Obora may refer to:

Obora, Lower Silesian Voivodeship, south-west Poland
Obora, Greater Poland Voivodeship, west-central Poland
Obora (Tachov District), west Czech Republic
Obora, Ethiopia, a town in Amuru Jarte woreda, Ethiopia
Obora, a mountain in the Silesian Beskids